Penshurst Station can refer to:
 Penshurst railway station, Kent, England
 Penshurst railway station, Sydney